Shenstone may refer to:

Places in England
Shenstone, Staffordshire, a village
Shenstone, Worcestershire, a village

People with the surname
Allen Shenstone (1893–1980), Canadian physicist
Beverley Shenstone, Canadian aerodynamicist
Clare Shenstone, English artist
William Shenstone (1714–1763), English poet and landscape gardener

See also
 Shenston, Ontario, Canada